Michelle Parkerson is an American filmmaker and academic. She is an assistant professor in Film and Media Arts at Temple University and has been an independent film/video maker since the 1980s, focusing particularly on feminist, LGBT, and political activism and issues.

Early life
Michelle Parkerson was born and raised in Washington, DC. In the early 1980s, Parkerson and Essex Hemphill, a poet, activist, and friend of Parkerson's, would often perform spoken word poetry in D.C. coffeehouses and theaters.  They received a grant from the Washington Project for the Arts in 1983 to produce an "experimental dramatization" of their poetry entitled Murder on Glass.

Career
Parkerson majored in TV and film production and graduated in 1974 with a B.A. in Communications from Temple University with the short Sojourn, a collaboration with Jimi Lyons, a cinematographer; the film won a Junior Academy Award. She is an alumna of the American Film Institute (AFI) Workshop for Women Directors, Class of 1989-91, where her classmates included Rita Mae Brown and Lyn Goldfarb.

Parkerson currently heads her own DC-based production company, Eye of the Storm Productions.

Parkerson has received grants from the Independent Television Service, the Corporation for Public Broadcasting, and the AFI as well as a fellowship from the Rockefeller Foundation. She was awarded the Prix du Public at the Festival International de Créteil Films de Femmes and the Audience and Best Biography Awards at the San Francisco International Film Festival. Her films are distributed by Women Make Movies and Third World Newsreel.

She is assistant professor in Film and Media Arts at Temple University.

She published a volume of poetry, Waiting Rooms, in 1983.

Parkerson was featured in the 2008 documentary black./womyn.: conversations with lesbians of African descent.

Films
Gibson describes Parkerson as "a visionary risk taker". Gibson describes Parkerson's films as being identity-related: "highlight[ing] the identities of black women as performers and social activists… serv[ing] as a major contributor to the development of a black documentary style that seeks a holistic approach to African-American life".

Her documentaries feature major African-American figures: jazz musician Betty Carter, musical group Sweet Honey in the Rock, Stonewall riots activist Stormé DeLarverie and writer Audre Lorde, with a particular focus on sexuality and LGBTQ activism in the latter two. Her fiction short Odds and Ends is a lesbian Afrofuturist science fiction story.

Parkerson's "love note never sent" to Lorde in The Feminist Wire reflects the activist motivation of her own filmmaking:

The zen of Audre Lorde is in vogue. But the tangible impact of your activism will keep surfacing internationally and for generations to come as long as communities of color are still under siege, as long as a woman remains voiceless and abused, as long as the lesbian love that dared "speak its name" is threatened with sequester.

Filmography
 Sojourn (1973, with Jimi Lyons)
 ..But Then She's Betty Carter (1980)
 I Remember Betty (1987)
 Urban Odyssey (1991)
 Storme: Lady of the Jewel Box (1991)
 Odds and Ends (1993)
 Gotta Make This Journey: Sweet Honey in the Rock (1983) (producer)
 A Litany for Survival: The Life and Work of Audre Lorde (1995, with Ada Gay Griffin)

Awards
Nominated for Grand Jury prize at Sundance Film Festival in 1995 for A Litany for Survival: The Life and Work of Audre Lorde

Bibliography 

 Parkerson, Michelle.  Waiting Rooms.  Common Ground Press (1983).

References

External links
 
 
 
 Michelle Parkerson at Women Make Movies
 Michelle Parkerson at African Film Festival, New York

Living people
African-American film directors
African-American film producers
American film producers
American documentary filmmakers
American film directors
Feminist filmmakers
Lesbian feminists
American lesbian artists
LGBT African Americans
Temple University faculty
American women documentary filmmakers
21st-century African-American people
1953 births